Abbasgulu agha Bakikhanov (21 June 1794, Amirjan – 31 May 1847, Wadi Fatima, near Jeddah), Abbas Qoli Bakikhanov, or Abbas-Qoli ibn Mirza Mohammad (Taghi) Khan Badkubi was an Azerbaijani writer, historian, journalist, linguist, poet and philosopher.

He was son of the third khan of Baku Mirza Muhammad Khan II. He later served as an officer in the Imperial Russian Army and participated in the Russo-Persian War of 1826–1828. He later retired and settled in Quba, but traveled extensively within Russia, meeting important literary figures as Alexander Pushkin.

Also known by his pen name Qodsi / Qudsi / Gudsi (Azeri: Qüdsi), Bakikhanov is referred to by many Azerbaijani scholars as being one of the "earliest (Azerbaijani) intellectuals and historians". He is credited with being the first person that wrote a proper "scholarly monograph on the history of greater Shirvan"; the area that would later make up most of the Republic of Azerbaijan. His Qanun-e Qudsi, was the first Persian grammar manual published in history.

Early life

According to other sources, Bakikhanov was born on 10 June 1794. His childhood contemporized with a defining epoch in the history of the Caucasus—the era of battles between Russia and Persia over political domination in the region. Bakikhanov was the son of the 3rd khan of Baku, Mirza Muhammad Khan II and a Georgian lady Sofia. He began his academic studies at the age of 7 and soon excelled in Persian. In 1813, seven years after the loss of the khanate's sovereignty, the family moved to Quba, where Bakikhanov studied social and life sciences, humanities, and languages. Within the next ten years, he learned Arabic, Turkish, and Russian, followed later by French and Polish. In 1818, he established the first Azeri literary society Golestan-i Iram. His poetry at this early phase displayed Bakikhanov's deep moral and philosophical involvement in Islam. In 1820, he enlisted in the Russian army as an interpreter and got a commission for taking part in suppressing the rebellious Kazikumukh Khanate (present-day southern Daghestan).

Political and diplomatic career
Bakikhanov actively participated in the political life of the Caucasus. He was a member of the Russian diplomatic mission that was in charge of negotiating border issues between Russia and Persia in the 1820s. In 1823, he assisted in gathering ethnographic information for the Description of the Province of Karabakh. In 1828, he was among the Russian military command under General Paskevich that took part in peace negotiations with Persia, which resulted in signing the Treaty of Turkmenchay. He managed to convince Khan Ehsan of Nakhchivan, as well as a number of Kurdish leaders of Persia to ally with Russia. The year after Bakikhanov was awarded the 4th Degree Medal of St. Vladimir for participating in the siege of Kars in the Russo-Turkish War of 1828-1829. For a while he served at the Russian Ministry of Foreign Affairs in Saint Petersburg, and had travelled to Kaunas, Riga, and Warsaw before he retired in 1835 and returned to the village of Amsar near Quba.

Career in education
Bakikhanov's religious views were generally liberal due to major European influences. He criticized fanaticism among the religious masses and the Obscurantism of the clergy. He promoted the Islamic culture in the region and in Russia as a whole. His ultimate goal was to establish a Muslim college in Baku and an Oriental languages school in Tbilisi. In 1832, he came up with a project for establishing a major educational institution for Muslims, where subjects would be taught in Russian, Persian, and Azeri. He went further, and wrote a number of textbooks through which students were expected to study. The project was sent to the governor of the Caucasus for approval but unfortunately was disregarded and never looked into. Bakikhanov also translated several fables by Ivan Krylov into Azeri — however, only one has been preserved till nowadays. His greatest accomplishment in the field of education was writing Qanun-e Qudsi, the first Persian grammar manual published in history.

Major works
 Riyadh al-Quds (The Holy Garden). Bakikhanov wrote his first book (in Azerbaijani) under religious influence from the Muslim communities of Quba. At the same time, Riyadh al-Quds was Bakikhanov's reflection piece on Shi'a mystic literature, such as Jila al-Uyun by Muhammed Baghir Majlisi.
 Golestan-e Eram (The Blooming Flower Garden) is one of his major works (written in Persian) and dedicated to the history of the East Caucasus from Ancient Times to 1813. An English translation of this work has been made by Willem Floor and Hasan Javadi and published by Mage Publishers in 2009.
 Ketab-e Asgariyyeh (The Book of Asgar) was Bakikhanov's first fiction book: a love story of two young people, persecuted by the fanatic society they lived in. The book was written in Azerbaijani language.
 Qanun-e Qodsi (The Holy Law) was the first book in history entirely dedicated to the grammar of the Persian language. Originally written in Persian in 1831, it was translated into Russian in 1841 and became one of the bases for the development of iranistics in Russia.
 Mishkat al-Anwar (The Cresset Niche). This book is an almanach of fables, parables, as well as some quotes from the Qur'an and references to Sufi mysticism overall aimed at preserving social values and morals within society. The book was written in Persian.
 Kashf al-Qaraib (The Discovery of the Unknown) was one of the school books written by Bakikhanov in the early 1830s in Persian, where he describes the discovery of the Americas.
 Asrar al-Malakut (The Secrets of Heavens) is an introduction to astronomy, written in Arabic.

Other works include Umumi Joghrafya (General Geography), Kitab-i Nasihat (The Book of Admonitions), etc., scientific essays, collected poems, articles, translations of various works into Azeri and Russian, etc.

Death
In 1845, Bakikhanov went on a hajj. On his way to the holy Islamic sights, he was warmly received by the Shah of Persia and was awarded the Shir-e Khorshid, the highest-ranking Persian medal. There he also visited Isfahan, Yazd, Shiraz, and Kermanshah. In Constantinople, Bakikhanov had an audience with the Sultan, who showed interest in some of his academic writings, particularly in Asrar al-Malakut, of which he was presented a copy. From there, Bakikhanov went to visit Mecca and Medina. On his way from Medina back to Damascus he caught cholera and died in the small town of Wadi Fatima in Hejaz (present-day Saudi Arabia) in 1847.

Family 
In 1826, Bakikhanov married Sakina (b. 1807) his paternal cousin and grandnephew of Fatali Khan, daughter of Kalb Huseyn agha, by whom he had two daughters:

 Zibün Nisa Begüm (b. 1831 - married to Hasan Bakikhanov) 
 Tughra Khanum (b. 1839 - married to Ahmad Bakikhanov)

Awards 

 Order of Saint Anna 3rd class - 1 January 1828 (for participation in Yerevan and Sardarabad battles of Russo-Persian War)
 Order of Saint Vladimir 4th class - 16 October 1828 (for the excellent courage and bravery shown in Russo-Turkish War and in the siege and capture of Kars)
 Order of Saint Anna 2nd class - 1829 (for taking part in the battles on June 19 and 20, 1829 in the Saganlug mountains)
 Order of Saint Anna 2nd class (version decorated with imperial crown) - 1829 (for participation in the battles on July 24, 1829 at Hart and September 27 at Bayburt)
 Order of Saint Stanislaus 3rd class - 1829
 Order of the Lion and the Sun 1st class (with diamonds on a diamond chain) - 1829

Memory

 There is a municipality named after Bakikhanov in Baku.
 History institute of Azerbaijan National Academy of Sciences is named after Bakikhanov.
 There is a street named after him in Nasimi rayon of Baku.
 In October 2011 Abbasgulu Bakikhanov's statue was unveiled in Baku, in the municipality of Baku named after Bakikhanov. The park Bakikhanov, where the monument is, was overhauled, and then the monument was erected there.
 He was portrayed by Fakhraddin Manafov in 2012 film "Ambassador of Morning".

Notes

References

Sources
 
 
 

Persian-language poets
19th-century Persian-language writers
Arabic-language writers
1794 births
1847 deaths
People from the Russian Empire
People of Qajar Iran
Writers from Baku
People of the Russo-Persian Wars
Deaths from cholera
19th-century poets
Military personnel of the Russian Empire
Writers from the Russian Empire
Historians from the Russian Empire
Poets from the Russian Empire
Male writers from the Russian Empire
19th-century Azerbaijani people